This is a chronological listing of the United States senators from Connecticut.

United States senators are popularly elected, for a six-year term, beginning January 3. Elections are held the first Tuesday after November 1. Before 1914, they were chosen by the Connecticut General Assembly, and before 1935, their terms began March 4. Its current U.S. senators are Democrats Richard Blumenthal (serving since 2011) and Chris Murphy (serving since 2013). Chris Dodd is Connecticut's longest-serving senator (1981–2011).

List of senators

|- style="height:2em"
! rowspan=7 | 1
| rowspan=7 align=left | Oliver Ellsworth
| rowspan=6  | Pro-Administration
| rowspan=7 nowrap | Mar 4, 1789 –Mar 8, 1796
| Elected in 1788.
| 1
| 
| rowspan=6 | 1
| Elected in 1788.Resigned.
| nowrap | Mar 4, 1789 –Mar 3, 1791
|  | Pro-Administration
| align=right | William S. Johnson
! 1

|- style="height:2em"
| rowspan=6 | Re-elected in 1791.Resigned to become Chief Justice of the United States.
| rowspan=10 | 2
| rowspan=2 
|  
| nowrap | Mar 4, 1791 –Jun 13, 1791
| colspan=3 | Vacant

|- style="height:2em"
| rowspan=2 | Elected to finish Johnson's term.Died.
| rowspan=2 nowrap | Jun 13, 1791 –Jul 23, 1793
| rowspan=2  | Pro-Administration
| rowspan=2 align=right | Roger Sherman
! rowspan=2 | 2

|- style="height:2em"
| rowspan=3 

|- style="height:2em"
|  
| nowrap | Jul 23, 1793 –Dec 2, 1793
| colspan=3 | Vacant

|- style="height:2em"
| Elected to finish Sherman's term.Retired.
| nowrap | Dec 2, 1793 –Mar 3, 1795
|  | Pro-Administration
| align=right | Stephen Mix Mitchell
! 3

|- style="height:2em"
|  | Federalist
| rowspan=5 
| rowspan=7 | 2
| rowspan=2 | Election date unknown.Resigned to become Lieutenant Governor of Connecticut.
| rowspan=2 nowrap | Mar 4, 1795 –Jun 10, 1796
| rowspan=2  | Federalist
| rowspan=2 align=right | Jonathan Trumbull Jr.
! rowspan=2 | 4

|- style="height:2em"
| rowspan=3 colspan=3 | Vacant
| rowspan=3 nowrap | Mar 8, 1796 –May 12, 1796
| rowspan=3 |  

|- style="height:2em"
|  
| nowrap | Jun 10, 1796 –Oct 13, 1796
| colspan=3 | Vacant

|- style="height:2em"
| rowspan=4 | Elected to finish Trumbull's term.
| rowspan=8 nowrap | Oct 13, 1796 –Jul 19, 1807
| rowspan=8  | Federalist
| rowspan=8 align=right | Uriah Tracy
! rowspan=8 | 5

|- style="height:2em"
! rowspan=10 | 2
| rowspan=10 align=left | James Hillhouse
| rowspan=10  | Federalist
| rowspan=10 nowrap | May 12, 1796 –Jun 10, 1810
| Elected to finish Ellsworth's term.

|- style="height:2em"
| rowspan=3 | Re-elected in 1797.
| rowspan=3 | 3
| 

|- style="height:2em"
| 

|- style="height:2em"
| 
| rowspan=3 | 3
| rowspan=3 | Re-elected in 1801.

|- style="height:2em"
| rowspan=5 | Re-elected in 1802.
| rowspan=5 | 4
| 

|- style="height:2em"
| 

|- style="height:2em"
| rowspan=3 
| rowspan=7 | 4
| Re-elected in 1807.Died.

|- style="height:2em"
|  
| nowrap | Jul 19, 1807 –Oct 25, 1807
| colspan=3 | Vacant

|- style="height:2em"
| rowspan=5 | Elected to finish Tracy's term.
| rowspan=6 nowrap | Oct 25, 1807 –May 13, 1813
| rowspan=6  | Federalist
| rowspan=6 align=right | Chauncey Goodrich
! rowspan=6 | 6

|- style="height:2em"
| Re-elected in 1809.Resigned.
| rowspan=6 | 5
| rowspan=3 

|- style="height:2em"
| colspan=3 | Vacant
| nowrap | Jun 10, 1810 –Dec 4, 1810
|  

|- style="height:2em"
! rowspan=7 | 3
| rowspan=7 align=left nowrap | Samuel W. Dana
| rowspan=7  | Federalist
| rowspan=7 nowrap | Dec 4, 1810 –Mar 3, 1821
| rowspan=4 | Elected to finish Hillhouse's term.

|- style="height:2em"
| 

|- style="height:2em"
| rowspan=2 
| rowspan=4 | 5
| Re-elected in 1813.Resigned to become Lieutenant Governor of Connecticut.

|- style="height:2em"
| rowspan=3 | Elected to finish Goodrich's term.Retired.
| rowspan=3 nowrap | May 13, 1813 –Mar 3, 1819
| rowspan=3  | Federalist
| rowspan=3 align=right | David Daggett
! rowspan=3 | 7

|- style="height:2em"
| rowspan=3 | Re-elected in 1814.
| rowspan=3 | 6
| 

|- style="height:2em"
| 

|- style="height:2em"
| 
| rowspan=5 | 6
| rowspan=5 | Elected in 1818.Re-elected in 1824 and presented his credentials but was not permitted to qualify.
| rowspan=5 nowrap | Mar 4, 1819 –Mar 3, 1825
| rowspan=5  | Democratic-Republican
| rowspan=5 align=right | James Lanman
! rowspan=5 | 8

|- style="height:2em"
! rowspan=2 | 4
| rowspan=2 align=left | Elijah Boardman
| rowspan=2  | Democratic-Republican
| rowspan=2 nowrap | Mar 4, 1821 –Aug 18, 1823
| rowspan=2 | Elected in 1821.Died.
| rowspan=6 | 7
| 

|- style="height:2em"
| rowspan=3 

|- style="height:2em"
| colspan=3 | Vacant
| nowrap | Aug 18, 1823 –Oct 8, 1823
|  

|- style="height:2em"
! rowspan=3 | 5
| rowspan=3 align=left | Henry W. Edwards
|  | Democratic-Republican
| rowspan=3 nowrap | Oct 8, 1823 –Mar 3, 1827
| rowspan=3 | Appointed to continue Boardman's term.Elected in 1824 to finish Boardman's term.

|- style="height:2em"
| rowspan=2  | Jacksonian
| rowspan=2 
| rowspan=4 | 7
|  
| nowrap | Mar 4, 1825 –May 4, 1825
| colspan=3 | Vacant

|- style="height:2em"
| rowspan=3 | Elected late to complete Lanman's term.
| rowspan=3 nowrap | May 4, 1825 –Mar 3, 1831
| rowspan=3  | NationalRepublican
| rowspan=3 align=right | Calvin Willey
! rowspan=3 | 9

|- style="height:2em"
! rowspan=3 | 6
| rowspan=3 align=left | Samuel A. Foot
| rowspan=3  | NationalRepublican
| rowspan=3 nowrap | Mar 4, 1827 –Mar 3, 1833
| rowspan=3 | Elected in 1826.Lost re-election.
| rowspan=3 | 8
| 

|- style="height:2em"
| 

|- style="height:2em"
| 
| rowspan=5 | 8
| rowspan=5 | Elected in 1831.
| rowspan=5 nowrap | Mar 4, 1831 –Mar 3, 1837
| rowspan=5  | NationalRepublican
| rowspan=5 align=right | Gideon Tomlinson
! rowspan=5 | 10

|- style="height:2em"
! rowspan=2 | 7
| rowspan=2 align=left | Nathan Smith
| rowspan=2  | NationalRepublican
| rowspan=2 nowrap | Mar 4, 1833 –Dec 6, 1835
| rowspan=2 | Elected in 1832.Died.
| rowspan=5 | 9
| 

|- style="height:2em"
| rowspan=3 

|- style="height:2em"
| colspan=3 | Vacant
| nowrap | Dec 6, 1835 – Dec 21, 1835
|  

|- style="height:2em"
! rowspan=2 | 8
| rowspan=2 align=left | John Milton Niles
| | Jacksonian
| rowspan=2 nowrap | Dec 21, 1835 –Mar 3, 1839
| rowspan=2 | Elected to finish Smith's term.Retired.

|- style="height:2em"
|  | Democratic
| 
| rowspan=5 | 9
| rowspan=5 | Elected in 1837.
| rowspan=5 nowrap | Mar 4, 1837 –Mar 3, 1843
| rowspan=5  | Democratic
| rowspan=5 | Perry Smith
! rowspan=5 | 11

|- style="height:2em"
! 9
| align=left nowrap | Thaddeus Betts
|  | Whig
| nowrap | Mar 4, 1839 –Apr 7, 1840
| Elected in 1838 or 1839.Died.
| rowspan=5 | 10
| rowspan=3 

|- style="height:2em"
| colspan=3 | Vacant
| nowrap | Apr 7, 1840 –May 4, 1840
|  

|- style="height:2em"
! rowspan=5 | 10
| rowspan=5 align=left | Jabez W. Huntington
| rowspan=5  | Whig
| rowspan=5 nowrap | May 4, 1840 –Nov 1, 1847
| rowspan=3 | Elected to finish Betts's term.

|- style="height:2em"
| 

|- style="height:2em"
| 
| rowspan=5 | 10
| rowspan=5 | Elected in 1842.Retired.
| rowspan=5 nowrap | Mar 4, 1843 –Mar 3, 1849
| rowspan=5  | Democratic
| rowspan=5 align=right | John Milton Niles
! rowspan=5 | 12

|- style="height:2em"
| rowspan=2 | Re-elected in 1844 or 1845.Died.
| rowspan=5 | 11
| 

|- style="height:2em"
| rowspan=3 

|- style="height:2em"
| colspan=3 | Vacant
| nowrap | Nov 1, 1847 –Nov 11, 1847
|  

|- style="height:2em"
! rowspan=2 | 11
| rowspan=2 align=left | Roger Sherman Baldwin
| rowspan=2  | Whig
| rowspan=2 nowrap | Nov 11, 1847 –Mar 3, 1851
| rowspan=2 | Appointed to continue Huntington's term.Elected in 1848 to finish Huntington's term.

|- style="height:2em"
| 
| rowspan=5 | 11
| rowspan=4 | Elected in 1848 or 1849.Resigned.
| rowspan=4 nowrap | Mar 4, 1849 –May 24, 1854
| rowspan=4  | Whig
| rowspan=4 align=right | Truman Smith
! rowspan=4 | 13

|- style="height:2em"
| colspan=3 | Vacant
| nowrap | Mar 4, 1851 –May 12, 1852
|  
| rowspan=5 | 12
| rowspan=2 

|- style="height:2em"
! rowspan=4 | 12
| rowspan=4 align=left | Isaac Toucey
| rowspan=4  | Democratic
| rowspan=4 nowrap | May 12, 1852 –Mar 3, 1857
| rowspan=4 | Elected late in 1852.Retired.

|- style="height:2em"
| rowspan=2 

|- style="height:2em"
| Elected to finish Smith's term.Retired.
| nowrap | May 24, 1854 –Mar 3, 1855
|  | Free Soil
| align=right | Francis Gillette
! 14

|- style="height:2em"
| 
| rowspan=3 | 12
| rowspan=3 | Elected in 1854.
| rowspan=6 nowrap | Mar 4, 1855 –Mar 3, 1867
| rowspan=6  | Republican
| rowspan=6 align=right | Lafayette S. Foster
! rowspan=6 | 15

|- style="height:2em"
! rowspan=6 | 13
| rowspan=6 align=left | James Dixon
| rowspan=6  | Republican
| rowspan=6 nowrap | Mar 4, 1857 –Mar 3, 1869
| rowspan=3 | Elected in 1856.
| rowspan=3 | 13
| 

|- style="height:2em"
| 

|- style="height:2em"
| 
| rowspan=3 | 13
| rowspan=3 | Re-elected in 1860.Lost re-election.

|- style="height:2em"
| rowspan=3 | Re-elected in 1863.Lost re-election.
| rowspan=3 | 14
| 

|- style="height:2em"
| 

|- style="height:2em"
| 
| rowspan=3 | 14
| rowspan=3 | Elected in 1866.
| rowspan=6 nowrap | Mar 4, 1867 –Nov 21, 1875
| rowspan=3  | Republican
| rowspan=6 align=right | Orris S. Ferry
! rowspan=6 | 16

|- style="height:2em"
! rowspan=3 | 14
| rowspan=3 align=left | William Alfred Buckingham
| rowspan=3  | Republican
| rowspan=3 nowrap | Mar 4, 1869 –Feb 5, 1875
| rowspan=3 | Elected in 1868 or 1869.Lost re-election and died before end of term.
| rowspan=4 | 15
| 

|- style="height:2em"
| 

|- style="height:2em"
| rowspan=2 
| rowspan=7 | 15
| rowspan=3 | Re-elected in 1872.Died.
| rowspan=2  | Liberal Republican

|- style="height:2em"
! rowspan=7 | 15
| rowspan=7 align=left | William W. Eaton
| rowspan=7  | Democratic
| rowspan=7 nowrap | Feb 5, 1875 –Mar 3, 1881
| Appointed to finish Buckingham's term, having been elected to the next term.

|- style="height:2em"
| rowspan=6 | Elected in 1874.Unknown if retired or lost re-election.
| rowspan=6 | 16
| rowspan=4 
|  | Republican

|- style="height:2em"
|  
| nowrap | Nov 21, 1875 –Nov 27, 1875
| colspan=3 | Vacant

|- style="height:2em"
| Appointed to continue Ferry's term.Retired when successor elected.
| nowrap | Nov 27, 1875 –May 17, 1876
|  | Democratic
| align=right | James E. English
! 17

|- style="height:2em"
| rowspan=2 | Elected to finish Ferry's term.
| rowspan=2 nowrap | May 17, 1876 –Mar 3, 1879
| rowspan=2  | Democratic
| rowspan=2 align=right | William Henry Barnum
! rowspan=2 | 18

|- style="height:2em"
| 

|- style="height:2em"
| 
| rowspan=3 | 16
| rowspan=3 | Elected in 1879.
| rowspan=13 nowrap | Mar 4, 1879 –Apr 21, 1905
| rowspan=13  | Republican
| rowspan=13 align=right | Orville H. Platt
! rowspan=13 | 19

|- style="height:2em"
! rowspan=13 | 16
| rowspan=13 align=left | Joseph Roswell Hawley
| rowspan=13  | Republican
| rowspan=13 nowrap | Mar 4, 1881 –Mar 3, 1905
| rowspan=3 | Elected in 1881.
| rowspan=3 | 17
| 

|- style="height:2em"
| 

|- style="height:2em"
| 
| rowspan=3 | 17
| rowspan=3 | Re-elected in 1885.

|- style="height:2em"
| rowspan=3 | Re-elected in 1887.
| rowspan=3 | 18
| 

|- style="height:2em"
| 

|- style="height:2em"
| 
| rowspan=3 |18
| rowspan=3 | Re-elected in 1891.

|- style="height:2em"
| rowspan=3 | Re-elected in 1893.
| rowspan=3 | 19
| 

|- style="height:2em"
| 

|- style="height:2em"
| 
| rowspan=3 | 19
| rowspan=3 | Re-elected in 1897.

|- style="height:2em"
| rowspan=4 | Re-elected in 1899.Retired.
| rowspan=4 | 20
| 

|- style="height:2em"
| 

|- style="height:2em"
| rowspan=2 
| rowspan=5 | 20
| Re-elected in 1903.Died.

|- style="height:2em"
| rowspan=2 |  
| rowspan=2 nowrap | Apr 21, 1905 –May 10, 1905
| rowspan=2 colspan=3 | Vacant

|- style="height:2em"
! rowspan=4 | 17
| rowspan=4 align=left | Morgan Bulkeley
| rowspan=4  | Republican
| rowspan=4 nowrap | Mar 4, 1905 –Mar 3, 1911
| rowspan=4 | Elected in 1905.Lost re-election.
| rowspan=4 | 21
| rowspan=2 

|- style="height:2em"
| rowspan=2 | Elected to finish Platt's term.
| rowspan=10 nowrap | May 10, 1905 –Oct 14, 1924
| rowspan=10  | Republican
| rowspan=10 align=right | Frank B. Brandegee
! rowspan=10 | 20

|- style="height:2em"
| 

|- style="height:2em"
| 
| rowspan=3 | 21
| rowspan=3 | Re-elected in 1909.

|- style="height:2em"
! rowspan=11 | 18
| rowspan=11 align=left | George P. McLean
| rowspan=11  | Republican
| rowspan=11 nowrap | Mar 4, 1911 –Mar 3, 1929
| rowspan=3 | Elected in 1911.
| rowspan=3 | 22
| 

|- style="height:2em"
| 

|- style="height:2em"
| 
| rowspan=3 | 22
| rowspan=3 | Re-elected in 1914.

|- style="height:2em"
| rowspan=3 | Re-elected in 1916.
| rowspan=3 | 23
| 

|- style="height:2em"
| 

|- style="height:2em"
| 
| rowspan=5 | 23
| rowspan=2 | Re-elected in 1920.Died.

|- style="height:2em"
| rowspan=5 | Re-elected in 1922.Retired.
| rowspan=5 | 24
| rowspan=3 

|- style="height:2em"
|  
| nowrap | Oct 14, 1924 –Dec 17, 1924
| colspan=3 | Vacant

|- style="height:2em"
| rowspan=2 | Elected to finish Brandegee's term and seated Jan 8, 1925.
| rowspan=5 nowrap | Dec 17, 1924 –Mar 3, 1933
| rowspan=5  | Republican
| rowspan=5 align=right | Hiram Bingham III
! rowspan=5 | 21

|- style="height:2em"
| 

|- style="height:2em"
| 
| rowspan=3 | 24
| rowspan=3 | Re-elected in 1926.Lost re-election.

|- style="height:2em"
! rowspan=3 | 19
| rowspan=3 align=left | Frederic C. Walcott
| rowspan=3  | Republican
| rowspan=3 nowrap | Mar 4, 1929 –Jan 3, 1935
| rowspan=3 | Elected in 1928.Lost re-election.
| rowspan=3 | 25
| 

|- style="height:2em"
| 

|- style="height:2em"
| 
| rowspan=3 | 25
| rowspan=3 | Elected in 1932.Lost re-election.
| rowspan=3 nowrap | Mar 4, 1933 –Jan 3, 1939
| rowspan=3  | Democratic
| rowspan=3 align=right | Augustine Lonergan
! rowspan=3 | 22

|- style="height:2em"
! rowspan=6 | 20
| rowspan=6 align=left | Francis T. Maloney
| rowspan=6  | Democratic
| rowspan=6 nowrap | Jan 3, 1935 –Jan 16, 1945
| rowspan=3 | Elected in 1934.
| rowspan=3 | 26
| 

|- style="height:2em"
| 

|- style="height:2em"
| 
| rowspan=3 | 26
| rowspan=3 | Elected in 1938.Lost re-election.
| rowspan=3 nowrap | Jan 3, 1939 –Jan 3, 1945
| rowspan=3  | Republican
| rowspan=3 align=right | John A. Danaher
! rowspan=3 | 23

|- style="height:2em"
| rowspan=3 | Re-elected in 1940.Died.
| rowspan=7 | 27
| 

|- style="height:2em"
| 

|- style="height:2em"
| rowspan=5 
| rowspan=8 | 27
| rowspan=8 | Elected in 1944.
| rowspan=9 nowrap | Jan 3, 1945 –Jul 28, 1952
| rowspan=9  | Democratic
| rowspan=9 align=right | Brien McMahon
! rowspan=9 | 24

|- style="height:2em"
| colspan=3 | Vacant
| nowrap | Jan 16, 1945 –Feb 15, 1945
|  

|- style="height:2em"
! 21
| align=left | Thomas C. Hart
|  | Republican
| nowrap | Feb 15, 1945 –Nov 5, 1946
| Appointed to continue Maloney's term.Successor qualified.

|- style="height:2em"
| colspan=3 | Vacant
| nowrap | Nov 5, 1946 –Dec 27, 1946
|  

|- style="height:2em"
! rowspan=3 | 22
| rowspan=3 align=left | Raymond E. Baldwin
| rowspan=3  | Republican
| rowspan=3 nowrap | Dec 27, 1946 –Dec 16, 1949
| Elected to finish Maloney's term.

|- style="height:2em"
| rowspan=2 | Elected to full term in 1946.Resigned.
| rowspan=7 | 28
| 

|- style="height:2em"
| rowspan=2 

|- style="height:2em"
! rowspan=5 | 23
| rowspan=5 align=left nowrap | William Benton
| rowspan=5  | Democratic
| rowspan=5 nowrap | Dec 17, 1949 –Jan 3, 1953
| rowspan=5 | Appointed to continue Baldwin's term.Elected to finish Baldwin's term.Lost re-election.

|- style="height:2em"
| rowspan=4 
| rowspan=6 | 28
| Re-elected in 1950.Died.

|- style="height:2em"
|  
| nowrap | Jul 28, 1952 –Aug 29, 1952
| colspan=3 | Vacant

|- style="height:2em"
| Appointed to continue McMahon's term.Retired when successor elected, and elected to the Class 1 seat.
| nowrap | Aug 29, 1952 –Nov 4, 1952
|  | Republican
| align=right | William A. Purtell
! 25

|- style="height:2em"
| rowspan=3 | Elected to finish McMahon's term.
| rowspan=6 nowrap | Nov 4, 1952 –Jan 3, 1963
| rowspan=6  | Republican
| rowspan=6 align=right | Prescott Bush
! rowspan=6 | 26

|- style="height:2em"
! rowspan=3 | 24
| rowspan=3 align=left | William A. Purtell
| rowspan=3  | Republican
| rowspan=3 nowrap | Jan 3, 1953 –Jan 3, 1959
| rowspan=3 | Elected in 1952.Lost re-election.
| rowspan=3 | 29
| 

|- style="height:2em"
| 

|- style="height:2em"
| 
| rowspan=3 | 29
| rowspan=3 | Re-elected in 1956.Retired.

|- style="height:2em"
! rowspan=6 | 25
| rowspan=6 align=left | Thomas J. Dodd
| rowspan=6  | Democratic
| rowspan=6 nowrap | Jan 3, 1959 –Jan 3, 1971
| rowspan=3 | Elected in 1958.
| rowspan=3 | 30
| 

|- style="height:2em"
| 

|- style="height:2em"
| 
| rowspan=3 | 30
| rowspan=3 | Elected in 1962.
| rowspan=9 nowrap | Jan 3, 1963 –Jan 3, 1981
| rowspan=9  | Democratic
| rowspan=9 align=right | Abraham Ribicoff
! rowspan=9 | 27

|- style="height:2em"
| rowspan=3 | Re-elected in 1964.Lost renomination, and lost re-election as an independent.
| rowspan=3 | 31
| 

|- style="height:2em"
| 

|- style="height:2em"
| 
| rowspan=3 | 31
| rowspan=3 | Re-elected in 1968.

|- style="height:2em"
! rowspan=9 | 26
| rowspan=9 align=left | Lowell Weicker
| rowspan=9  | Republican
| rowspan=9 nowrap | Jan 3, 1971 –Jan 3, 1989
| rowspan=3 | Elected in 1970.
| rowspan=3 | 32
| 

|- style="height:2em"
| 

|- style="height:2em"
| 
| rowspan=3 | 32
| rowspan=3 | Re-elected in 1974.Retired.

|- style="height:2em"
| rowspan=3 | Re-elected in 1976.
| rowspan=3 | 33
| 

|- style="height:2em"
| 

|- style="height:2em"
| 
| rowspan=3 | 33
| rowspan=3 | Elected in 1980.
| rowspan=15 nowrap | Jan 3, 1981 –Jan 3, 2011
| rowspan=15  | Democratic
| rowspan=15 align=right | Chris Dodd
! rowspan=15 | 28

|- style="height:2em"
| rowspan=3 | Re-elected in 1982.Lost re-election.
| rowspan=3 | 34
| 

|- style="height:2em"
| 

|- style="height:2em"
| 
| rowspan=3 | 34
| rowspan=3 | Re-elected in 1986.

|- style="height:2em"
! rowspan=12 | 27
| rowspan=12 align=left | Joe Lieberman
| rowspan=9  | Democratic
| rowspan=12 nowrap | Jan 3, 1989 –Jan 3, 2013
| rowspan=3 | Elected in 1988.
| rowspan=3 | 35
| 

|- style="height:2em"
| 

|- style="height:2em"
| 
| rowspan=3 | 35
| rowspan=3 | Re-elected in 1992.

|- style="height:2em"
| rowspan=3 | Re-elected in 1994.
| rowspan=3 | 36
| 

|- style="height:2em"
| 

|- style="height:2em"
| 
| rowspan=3 | 36
| rowspan=3 | Re-elected in 1998.

|- style="height:2em"
| rowspan=3 | Re-elected in 2000.
| rowspan=3 | 37
| 

|- style="height:2em"
| 

|- style="height:2em"
| 
| rowspan=3 | 37
| rowspan=3 | Re-elected in 2004.Retired.

|- style="height:2em"
| rowspan=3  | Independent
| rowspan=3 | Lost re-nomination, but re-elected in 2006 as an Independent.Retired.
| rowspan=3 | 38
| 

|- style="height:2em"
| 

|- style="height:2em"
| 
| rowspan=3 | 38
| rowspan=3 | Elected in 2010.
| rowspan=9 nowrap | Jan 3, 2011 –Present
| rowspan=9  | Democratic
| rowspan=9 align=right | Richard Blumenthal
! rowspan=9 | 29

|- style="height:2em"
! rowspan=6 | 28
| rowspan=6 align=left | Chris Murphy
| rowspan=6  | Democratic
| rowspan=6 nowrap | Jan 3, 2013 –Present
| rowspan=3 | Elected in 2012.
| rowspan=3 | 39
| 

|- style="height:2em"
| 

|- style="height:2em"
| 
| rowspan=3 | 39
| rowspan=3 | Re-elected in 2016.

|- style="height:2em"
| rowspan=3 | Re-elected in 2018.
| rowspan=3 | 40
| 

|- style="height:2em"
| 

|- style="height:2em"
| 
| rowspan=3 | 40
| rowspan=3 | Re-elected in 2022.

|- style="height:2em"
| rowspan=3 colspan=5 | To be determined in the 2024 election.
| rowspan=3 | 41
| 

|- style="height:2em"
| 

|- style="height:2em"
| 
| 41
| colspan=5 | To be determined in the 2028 election.

See also

 List of United States representatives from Connecticut
 United States congressional delegations from Connecticut
 Elections in Connecticut

References

 
Connecticut
United States senators